12th London Film Critics Circle Awards
1992

Film of the Year: 
 Thelma & Louise 

British Film of the Year: 
 Life Is Sweet 

The 12th London Film Critics Circle Awards, honouring the best in film for 1991, were announced by the London Film Critics Circle in 1992.

Winners
Film of the Year
Thelma & Louise

British Film of the Year
Life Is Sweet

Foreign Language Film of the Year
Cyrano de Bergerac • France

Director of the Year
Ridley Scott – Thelma & Louise

British Director of the Year
Alan Parker – The Commitments

Screenwriter of the Year
David Mamet – Homicide

British Screenwriter of the Year
Dick Clement, Ian La Frenais and Roddy Doyle – The Commitments

Actor of the Year
Gérard Depardieu – Cyrano de Bergerac and Green Card

Actress of the Year
Susan Sarandon – Thelma & Louise and White Palace

British Actor of the Year
Alan Rickman – Close My Eyes, Truly, Madly, Deeply, Quigley Down Under and Robin Hood: Prince of Thieves

Newcomer of the Year
Annette Bening – The Grifters, Guilty by Suspicion, Regarding Henry, Valmont and Postcards from the Edge

British Technical Achievement of the Year
Peter Greenaway – Prospero's Books

British Producer of the Year
Lynda Myles and Roger Randall-Cutler – The Commitments

Special Achievement Award
John Sayles

Dilys Powell Award
Dirk Bogarde

External links
IMDB
Official Website

1
1991 film awards
1991 in London
1991 in British cinema
1991 awards in the United Kingdom